The Exorcism of Molly Hartley is a 2015 American supernatural horror film written by Matt Venne and directed by Steven R. Monroe. The film is a sequel to the 2008 film The Haunting of Molly Hartley. It was released on Digital HD on October 9, 2015, and on Blu-ray on October 20, 2015.

Plot

After causing a botched exorcism that resulted in the death of a fellow priest, Father James (Tom McLaren) and a pregnant woman, Father John Barrow (Devon Sawa) is committed to a Catholic mental asylum. Chaplain Henry Davies (Peter MacNeill) informs him that the Vatican has revoked his status as a priest. Meanwhile, Molly Hartley (Sarah Lind), is arrested after police find the corpses of the two friends she engaged in a threesome with the night before. While interrogating Molly, she hears strange noises before she begins to have a deeper voice and refers to herself as "we". She is sent to the same mental asylum for psychiatric evaluation under Dr. Laurie Hawthorn (Gina Holden), but her condition worsens after an insect-like creature enters her body.

Hawthorn looks through Molly's past records and diagnoses Molly's symptoms as her subconscious fulfilling a claim she told her high school guidance counselor that she was claimed by the devil on her eighteenth birthday and describes it as an incubation or pregnancy for six years, six months, and six days. However, after supernatural occurrences happen around Molly, Dr. Hawthorn begins to believe in demonic possession. With limited options, she asks Barrow to perform the exorcism in exchange for signing his release forms. Though he initially refuses, after the suicide of an asylum employee, supernatural occurrences, and seeing Molly for himself, he visits Davies, who encourages him to help Molly, handing him his clerical attire and the items he needs to perform the exorcism. Barrow manages to perform the exorcism, trapping several insects that come out of Molly's mouth in a special box, which he keeps in a container filled with holy water.

Barrow returns the container to Davies, who places it in his basement for safekeeping. Barrow notices Davies' book on Satanism and how the letters on the cover match the letters on Molly's forehead during the exorcism. Davies explains this is "Leviathan", the fourth book of the Satanic Bible that explains the Antichrist will be born after the worst sin committed, Matricide, is committed on the "mother of the devil" or the person whose body was used to incubate the devil. Barrow demands to see the box, but upon opening the container, he finds that the box has been replaced with a large stone. Davies hits Barrow, knocking him out.

Barrow wakes up in a locked room in the asylum where he witnesses a patient commit suicide in the room next to him filled with other dead patients. An orderly comes brandishing a gun and orders him to come with him. Barrow and the orderly arrive at the underground room, where Davies takes part in a ritual to sacrifice Molly to bring forth the Antichrist and Barrow, the father of the devil since he was the one who extracted the devil through an unholy ritual. Before he can kill Molly, Dr. Hawthorn stabs Davies through the abdomen, dropping the box and releasing the insects, providing a distraction as Molly stabs Davies. Barrow, Dr. Hawthorn, and Molly escape while several of the participants are killed by the insects.Barrow assures Molly she is safe as she is driven away in an ambulance. Meanwhile, one of the insects flies into a moving school bus, where it approaches an outcast girl at the back of the bus. It inches toward her ear as the screen goes black.

Cast
 Sarah Lind as Molly Hartley
 Devon Sawa as Father John Barrow
 Gina Holden as Dr. Laurie Hawthorn
 Peter MacNeill as Chaplain Henry Davies
 Daina Leitold as Janet Jones
 Julia Arkos as Beatrice White
 Tom McLaren as Father James
 Bradley Sawatzky as Orderly #1
 Steve Weller as Orderly #2
 John Cor as Daryl

Reception
Trace Thurman of Bloody Disgusting gave the film a negative review, noting that "No one (and we mean no one) was asking for a sequel to the 2008 PG-13 horror film The Haunting of Molly Hartley." Adam Lee Price of Fangoria was more mixed in his review, stating that "the film did have its moments" while remarking that it was "an in-title-only sequel" to The Haunting of Molly Hartley.

References

External links
 
 

2015 direct-to-video films
American supernatural horror films
American direct-to-video films
2015 horror films
20th Century Fox direct-to-video films
Direct-to-video sequel films
2010s English-language films
Films directed by Steven R. Monroe
2010s American films